Datapanik in the Year Zero is a 1996 box set by Pere Ubu, which catalogues their initial phase of existence up to their 1982 break-up (which later turned out to be merely a hiatus). The title was first used by the band for a 1978 EP which compiled their first singles; the name was "recycled" for this release. The name references the Cold War film Panic in Year Zero! (1962).

This box set compiles the original EP of the same name, their first five albums (which were out of print at the time this set was released), along with a disc of live material, and another of related rarities. It omits "Use of a Dog" from Song of the Bailing Man, "Humor Me", "Not Happy" and "Lonesome Cowboy Dave" from Terminal Tower and the vocal version of "Arabia" from The Art of Walking. Since, according to David Thomas, Pere Ubu do not produce outtakes or alternate versions (aside from a few anomalies related to an early version of The Art of Walking), the rarities disc is unique in that it features groups that were sometimes only tangentially related to Ubu, in an effort to present an overview of the mercurial Cleveland scene out of which they grew.

In 2009, Cooking Vinyl released a remastered version of the box set. It restores "Use of a Dog" but omits the fourth disc of live recordings.

Track listing 
All tracks by Pere Ubu

Disc 1: 1975-1977

"30 Seconds Over Tokyo" – 6:21
"Heart of Darkness" – 4:44
"Final Solution" – 4:58
"Cloud 149" – 2:37
"Untitled" – 3:32
"My Dark Ages" – 4:00
"Heaven" – 3:04
"Nonalignment Pact" – 3:18
"The Modern Dance" – 3:28 (album mix)
"Laughing" – 4:35
"Street Waves" – 3:04
"Chinese Radiation" – 3:27
"Life Stinks" – 1:52
"Real World" – 4:00
"Over My Head" – 3:49
"Sentimental Journey" – 6:06
"Humor Me" – 2:43
"The Book Is on the Table" – 4:02

Disc 2: 1978-1979
"Navvy" – 2:40
"On the Surface" – 2:35
"Dub Housing" – 3:40
"Caligari's Mirror" – 3:49
"Thriller!" – 4:36
"I, Will Wait" – 1:46
"Drinking Wine Spodyody" – 2:44
"Ubu Dance Party" – 4:46
"Blow Daddy O" – 3:38
"Codex" – 4:54
"The Fabulous Sequel (Have Shoes, Will Walk)" – 3:07
"49 Guitars & One Girl" – 2:51
"A Small Dark Cloud" – 5:49
"Small Was Fast" – 3:30
"All the Dogs Are Barking" – 3:02
"One Less Worry" – 3:46
"Make Hay" – 4:02
"Goodbye" – 5:17
"Voice of the Sand" – 1:27
"Jehovah's Kingdom Comes" – 3:15

Disc 3: 1980-1982
"Go" – 3:35
"Rhapsody in Pink" – 3:34
"Arabia" – 4:59
"Young Miles in the Basement" – 4:20
"Misery Goats" – 2:38
"Loop" – 3:15
"Rounder" – 3:24
"Birdies" – 2:27
"Lost in Art" – 5:12
"Horses" – 2:35
"Crush This Horn" – 3:00
"The Long Walk Home" – 2:35
"Petrified" – 2:16
"Stormy Weather" – 3:18
"West Side Story" – 2:46
"Thoughts That Go by Steam" – 3:47
"Big Ed's Used Farms" – 2:24
"A Day Such as This" – 7:16
"The Vulgar Boatman Bird" – 2:49
"My Hat" – 1:19
"Horns Are a Dilemma" – 4:21

Disc 4: 390 Degrees of Simulated Stereo, Volume 2
"Vocal Liner Notes" 0:56
"Theatre 140, 5/5/78" 0:07
"Real World" – 4:32
"Laughing" – 5:19
"Street Waves" – 4:30
"Humor Me" – 3:08
"Over My Head" – 5:00
"Sentimental Journey" – 8:49
"Life Stinks" – 3:13
"My Dark Ages" – 5:30
"C. Teatro Medica, 3/3/81" 0:11
"The Modern Dance" – 3:40
"Codex" – 3:24
"Ubu Dance Party" – 3:57
"Big Ed's Used Farms" – 3:27
"Real World" – 2:46
"Birdies" – 2:15

Disc 5: Terminal Drive (Ubu-related rarities)
Foreign Bodies: "The Incredible Truth" – 2:35
15-60-75: "It's in Imagination" – 4:43
Syd's Dance Band: "Never Again" – 2:20
Carney & Thomas: "Sunset in the Antipodes" – 2:26
Home & Garden: "(please) FIX MY HORN (my brakes don't work)" – 3:24
Neptune's Car: "Baking Bread" – 2:13
David Thomas: "Atom Mind" – 2:29
Tripod Jimmie: "Autumn Leaves" – 4:17
Friction: "Dear Richard" – 5:56
Pressler-Morgan: "You're Gonna Watch Me" – 1:40
Rocket from the Tombs: "Amphetamine" – 5:32
Mirrors: "She Smiled Wild" – 3:57
Electric Eels: "Jaguar Ride" – 1:46
Tom Herman: "Steve Canyon Blues" – 4:17
Allen Ravenstine: "Home Life" – 6:47
Rocket from the Tombs: "30 Seconds Over Tokyo" – 7:00
Proto Ubu: "Heart of Darkness" – 8:47
Pere Ubu: "Pushin' Too Hard" – 3:54

Personnel 

Michael Aylward – Guitar
Scott Benedict – Drums
Cindy Black – Moog Synthesizer
Lenny Bove – Bass
Ralph Carney – Keyboards, Saxophone
Brian Cox – Bass
Jim Crook – Bass
Chris Cutler – Drums
Albert Dennis – Bowed Bass
The Electric Eels – Performer
Eric Drew Feldman – Keyboards
Anton Fier – Drums
John Freskos – Guitar
Friction – Performer
Alan Greenblatt – Guitar
Kenneth Hamann – Producer
Paul Hamann – Bass, Producer, Digital Transfers
Tom Herman – Bass, Rhythm Guitar, Vocals
Home and Garden – Producer
John Hume – Photography
Terry Hynde – Alto Saxophone
Bart Johnson – Bass
Jim Jones – Bass, Producer, Compilation Producer
Bob Kidney – Guitar, Vocals
Jack Kidney – Tenor Saxophone
Adam Kidron – Producer
Jamie Klimek – Guitar, Vocals
Scott Krauss – Organ, Drums, Tape
Peter Laughner – Guitar, Vocals
Tony Maimone – Synthesizer, Bass, Keyboards, Vocals
Paul Marotta – Producer
Brian McMahon – Guitar
Morgan – Performer
Douglas Morgan – Guitar, Harp, Vocals, Producer
Pat Morgan – Guitar
John Morton – Guitar
Pere Ubu – Producer
Mark Price – Bass
Allen Ravenstine – Synthesizer, Tape, Performer
Dave Robinson – Drums
Rocket from the Tombs – Performer
Pat Ryan – Producer
Susan Schmidt – Guitar
Tom Simon – Photography
Michael Stacey – Guitar
Michele Temple – Bass
David Thomas – Organ, Harmonica, Saxophone, Vocals, Producer, Performer, Digital Transfers, Compilation Producer
John Thompson – Design, Photography
Mayo Thompson – Guitar
Tripod Jimmie – Performer
Michael J. Weldon – Drums
Robert Wheeler – Synthesizer, Theremin
Tim Wright – Bass, Guitar

References

External links 
 Datapanik In The Year Zero: The Box Set - original release description

Pere Ubu albums
1996 compilation albums